Paul "Pol" Goffaux (2 November 1916 – 29 March 1977) was a Belgian boxer who competed in the 1936 Summer Olympics.

In 1936 he was eliminated in the first round of the light heavyweight class after losing his fight to František Havelka.

External links
 
 Pol Goffaux's profile at Sports Reference.com

1916 births
1977 deaths
Light-heavyweight boxers
Olympic boxers of Belgium
Boxers at the 1936 Summer Olympics
Belgian male boxers